Quercus turbinella is a North American species of oak known by the common names shrub oak, turbinella oak, shrub live oak, and gray oak. It is native to Arizona,  California, New Mexico, Utah, Colorado, and Nevada in the western United States. It also occurs in northern Mexico.

Description 
Quercus turbinella is a shrub growing  in height but sometimes becoming treelike and exceeding . The branches are gray or brown, the twigs often coated in short woolly fibers when young and becoming scaly with age. They are gray-green to yellowish in color and waxy in texture on the upper surfaces, and yellowish and hairy or woolly and glandular on the lower surfaces. The males catkins are yellowish-green and the female flowers are in short spikes in the leaf axils, appearing at the same time as the new growth of leaves. The fruit is a yellowish brown acorn up to two centimeters long with a shallow warty cup about a centimeter wide. This oak reproduces sexually via its acorns if there is enough moisture present, but more often it reproduces vegetatively by sprouting from its rhizome and root crown.

Distribution 
Quercus turbinella has been found in Arizona, New Mexico, Colorado, Utah, Nevada, southern California, and western Texas, as well as Baja California. In California, it occurs in the New York mountains and a few eastern California desert ranges. The populations on the desert mountains in the western Mojave desert and the inner coastal ranges are now considered Quercus john-tuckeri. It grows in woodland, chaparral, forest, and other habitat. It is most common in chaparral habitat in central Arizona, through the transition zone of the Mogollon Rim–White Mountains, but also southeast Arizona in the Madrean Sky Island mountain ranges of sky islands.

Ecology 
Quercus turbinella easily hybridizes with other oak species, including Quercus gambelii, Q. havardii, Q. arizonica, and Q. grisea. Many species of animals use it for food, with wild and domesticated ungulates browsing the foliage and many birds and mammals eating the acorns. Animals also use the shrub as cover, and mountain lions hide their kills in the thickets.

See also
 Quercus × alvordiana

References

External links
 
 Flora of North America; flora of North America RangeMap
 

turbinella
Trees of Northwestern Mexico
Trees of the Southwestern United States
Trees of the South-Central United States
Flora of the California desert regions
Flora of the Sonoran Deserts
Natural history of the Colorado Desert
Natural history of the Mojave Desert
Plants described in 1889
Oaks of Mexico